Rusiate Nasove (born 27 October 1995) is a Fijian rugby union player, currently playing for the . His preferred position is flanker.

Professional career
Naove was named in the Fijian Drua squad for the 2022 Super Rugby Pacific season. He had previously represented the Drua in the 2019 National Rugby Championship.

References

External links
itsrugby.co.uk Profile

1995 births
Living people
Fijian rugby union players
Rugby union flankers
Fijian Drua players
Fiji international rugby union players